Susan Connolly may refer to:

 Susan E. Connolly, Irish fiction and non-fiction writer who has worked in comics, screenwriting, short fiction and novels
 Susan Connolly (poet) (born 1956), Irish poet
 Susan Connolly (artist) (born 1976), Irish artist